1967 Academy Awards may refer to:

 39th Academy Awards, the Academy Awards ceremony that took place in 1967
 40th Academy Awards, the 1968 ceremony honoring the best in film for 1967